The 1951 South Dakota Coyotes football team was an American football team that represented the University of South Dakota as a member of the North Central Conference (NCC) during the 1951 college football season. In their 14th season under head coach Harry Gamage, the Coyotes compiled a 7–1 record (6–0 against NCC opponents) and outscored opponents by a total of 218 to 107. They played their home games at Inman Field in Vermillion, South Dakota.

Schedule

References

South Dakota
South Dakota Coyotes football seasons
North Central Conference football champion seasons
South Dakota Coyotes football